Minsteracres is an 18th-century mansion house, now a Christian retreat centre, in Northumberland, England. It is a Grade II listed building.

The house was built in 1758 by George Silvertop. Originally erected with two storeys, a third storey was added in 1811 and a new North wing was built in 1865.

The Silvertops were a Roman Catholic family. George Silvertop was in 1831 the first Catholic appointed High Sheriff of Northumberland  following the repeal of the penal law.
His nephew Henry Charles Silvertop, High Sheriff in 1859 built a Catholic chapel adjoining the hall, and dedicated to St Elizabeth of Hungary in 1854. The chapel is a Grade II listed building.

The Silvertop family sold the House in 1949 for conversion to a Passionist Monastery. A retreat house was opened in 1967, and in the 1970s links were established with the Selly Park sisters  and the Sisters of Mercy from Sunderland. Since 2012 Minsteracres has been run by a charitable trust on behalf of the Passionist community. It describes itself as a "Christian place of prayer with a resident community rooted in the Roman Catholic Passionist tradition".

The east and west lodges, stable block, entrance screen with flanking walls and a group of farm buildings are all separately grade II listed.

References

External links

Grade II listed buildings in Northumberland
Former Christian monasteries in the United Kingdom
Passionist Order
Catholic spirituality
Spiritual retreats
Roman Catholic Diocese of Hexham and Newcastle